Bu Şehir Arkandan Gelecek is a Turkish television series signed by Ay Yapım, produced by Kerem Çatay, written by Ece Yörenç, directed by Çağrı Vila Lostuvalı, starring Kerem Bürsin, Leyla Lydia Tuğutlu and Gürkan Uygun. It ended on 14 June 2017 by making a final.

Plot 
Witnessing the death of his mother when he was only five years old, Ali is adopted and raised by Rauf, who is a cook on cargo ships.  Working together on ships, they leave behind 24 years, Rauf is both a mother and father to Ali, dedicating his life to Ali to make him forget the trauma he experienced.  For years, Ali has not wanted to work on ships that call to Istanbul.  After the great trauma he experienced, he is offended by the city, and years later, "Rauf's mother" agrees to come with him because he is longing for Istanbul, but there is only one condition: he will not go down to the port.  However, Rauf came to Istanbul especially for Ali.  He is aware that his own disease is progressing.  He is determined to reveal the secrets of Ali's past before he dies, and to entrust Ali to safe hands.  For this reason, he finds the former boxing champion Şahin Vargı.  When they set foot in the port, things do not develop as Rauf thinks.  As soon as Ali gets off the ship, he becomes the hero of the story of a girl he does not know.

Cast

Main characters

Other characters

Series overview

Awards and nominations

References

External links 
 Bu Şehir Arkandan Gelecek on ATV
 Ayyapım - Bu Şehir Arkandan Gelecek 

Turkish drama television series
2017 Turkish television series debuts
2017 Turkish television series endings
Television series by Ay Yapım
Television shows set in Istanbul